Eucalyptus blaxellii, commonly known as the Howatharra mallee, is a mallee that is endemic to Western Australia. It has smooth bark, linear to narrow lance-shaped adult leaves, flower buds arranged in groups of seven, white flowers and cup-shaped to conical fruit.

Description
The bark is smooth and grey over pinkish-brown or coppery coloured new bark. Flowering occurs between August and November and the flowers are creamy white.

Taxonomy and naming
Eucalyptus balxellii was first formally described in 1992 by Ken Hill and Lawrie Johnson from a specimen collected in 1978 at Howatharra Gap north of Geraldton by Donald Blaxell. The description was published in the journal Telopea. The specific epithet (blaxellii) honours the collector of the type specimen who discovered the species.

Distribution and habitat
The Howatharra mallee is found on rocky hillsides and creek flats in the Wheatbelt near Morawa and in the Mid West region between Northampton and Geraldton in the Moresby Range where it grows in sandy-clay soils. It is an emergent in heath and occurs with Eucalyptus loxophleba, Eucalyptus stowardii, Allocasuarina campestris, Melaleuca megacephala, Gastrolobium spinosum and various species of Acacia.

Conservation
This mallee eucalypt is classified as "Priority Four" by the Government of Western Australia Department of Parks and Wildlife, meaning that is rare or near threatened.

See also

List of Eucalyptus species

References

Eucalypts of Western Australia
Trees of Australia
blaxellii
Myrtales of Australia
Plants described in 1992
Taxa named by Lawrence Alexander Sidney Johnson
Taxa named by Ken Hill (botanist)